Reed's Creek Farm is a historic home located at Centreville, Queen Anne's County, Maryland, United States. It is a late Georgian style brick house reputedly begun in 1775. It is composed of two portions, the larger of the two being a five bay structure laid in Flemish bond.

Reed's Creek Farm was listed on the National Register of Historic Places in 1975.

References

External links
, including undated photo, at Maryland Historical Trust

Houses on the National Register of Historic Places in Maryland
Houses in Queen Anne's County, Maryland
Houses completed in 1775
Georgian architecture in Maryland
National Register of Historic Places in Queen Anne's County, Maryland
1775 establishments in Maryland